The 1992 King Fahd Cup Final was a football match to determine the winners of the 1992 King Fahd Cup. The match was held at King Fahd II Stadium, Riyadh, Saudi Arabia, on 20 October 1992 and was contested by Argentina and Saudi Arabia. Argentina won the match 3–1. For Saudi Arabia, this appearance meant they were the first Asian team to reach the final of a major FIFA tournament.

Match details

References 
 Match report

Final
1992
Argentina national football team matches
Saudi Arabia national football team matches
King Fahd Cup Final
King Fahd Cup Final
King Fahd Cup Final